The PGL Major Antwerp 2022, also known as PGL Major 2022 or Antwerp 2022, was the seventeenth Counter-Strike: Global Offensive (CS:GO) Major Championship. It was held in Antwerp, Belgium at the Sportpaleis from May 9 to 22, 2022. Twenty-four teams participated, with most qualifying through regional tournaments. It featured a  prize pool, half of the previous Major. It was the third Major hosted by the Romanian organization PGL, after PGL Major: Kraków 2017 and PGL Major Stockholm 2021. The Major would be won by FaZe Clan, the first international team in CS:GO history to win a Major.

Background 
Counter-Strike: Global Offensive is a multiplayer first-person shooter video game developed by Hidden Path Entertainment and Valve Corporation. It is the fourth game in the Counter-Strike series. In professional CS:GO, the Valve-sponsored Majors are the most prestigious tournaments.

The defending Major Champions were Natus Vincere, who won their first Major at Stockholm 2021. Natus Vincere would finish second at the Major, losing to FaZe Clan in the grand finals.

Format

Map Pool

Teams Competing 

 Legends

 Heroic
 Copenhagen Flames
 BIG Clan
 Cloud9
 FaZe Clan
 Ninjas in Pyjamas
 Natus Vincere
 FURIA Esports

 Challengers

 ENCE
 G2 Esports
 forZe
 Astralis
 Team Vitality
 Bad News Eagles
 MIBR
 Imperial Esports

 Contenders

 Eternal Fire
 Team Spirit
 Outsiders
 Complexity Gaming
 Team Liquid
 9z Team
 IHC Esports
 Renegades

New Challengers Stage 

The New Challengers stage took place from May 9 to May 12, 2022. The Challengers stage, also known as the Preliminary stage and formerly known as the offline qualifier, is a sixteen team swiss tournament. Initial seeding was determined using RMR standings, from the 2nd round forward the Buchholz system was used.

New Legends Stage 
The format of the New Legends stage was the same as the New Challengers stage: a 16-team Swiss-system tournament with the top eight teams advancing to the playoff bracket.

New Champions Stage 
With eight teams remaining, the final stage of the Major is a single-elimination bracket, with all matches played as best-of-3 maps.

Bracket

Quarterfinals

FaZe Clan vs. Ninjas in Pyjamas
Casters: Scrawny & launders

FURIA Esports vs. Team Spirit
Casters: JustHarry & Hugo

Copenhagen Flames vs. ENCE
Casters: Vince & Bleh

Heroic vs. Natus Vincere
Casters: Machine & SPUNJ

Semifinals

Team Spirit vs. FaZe Clan
Casters: JustHarry & Hugo

Natus Vincere vs. ENCE
Casters: Scrawny & launders

Finals

FaZe Clan vs. Natus Vincere  
Casters: Machine & SPUNJ

Final standings
The final placings are shown below. In addition, the prize distribution, seed for the next major, roster, and coaches are shown.

Notes

References 

2022 first-person shooter tournaments
Counter-Strike: Global Offensive Majors